Beverly Hills Teens is an American animated children's television program produced by DIC Animation City. Distributed by Access Syndication and originally airing in first-run syndication in the United States from September 21, 1987 through December 18, 1987 and airing in The Children's Channel in the United Kingdom from March 1, 1994 through February 28, 1998, the series consists of one extended season, comprising a total of 65 episodes, each 30 minutes long. After its original run, the series continued to be broadcast as part of a syndication package featuring rebroadcasts of Maxie's World and It's Punky Brewster, and has subsequently acquired the retronym Beverly Hills Teen Club.

Developed by Jack Olesker, Michael Maliani and Barry O'Brien, and executive produced by Andy Heyward, the series' namesake teenagers reside in the exclusive enclave of Beverly Hills, California and are shown to have exaggerated wealth, exemplified by mansions, yachts, and limousines, while navigating typical teenage concerns, including schoolwork, friendships, and romantic rivalries. In 1989, the series was nominated for the Youth in Film Award (now known as the Young Artist Award) as "Best Animated Series."

Development

In January 1987, the wire services reported that Access Syndication, which was partnered with DIC Enterprises and Coca-Cola Telecommunications, had three new animated children's series in development for the fall of that year. The three series said to be in various stages of production at that time were Tiffany Blake, Starcom: The U.S. Space Force and Beverly Hills Teens.

Described by one columnist as "[s]poiled rich kids who attend classes equipped with Louis XIV antique desks", Beverly Hills Teens was touted by producers as a response to the more violent series aimed at children, maintaining that the new series would be less action-based and more character driven, and would provide "wholesome role models for kids."

President of Access Syndicate, Ritch Colbert lamented the state of children's entertainment at the time, stating "Children's programming these days is dominated by neo-miiltaristic, boy-toy animation." Citing shows like SilverHawks, ThunderCats and G.I. Joe, which were popular animated series of the time, Colbert continued "Where are the Tom and Jerrys, the Flintstones, the rich characters for children to nurture and develop and identify with?"

When questioned as to whether "money-happy" teens residing in Beverly Hills would be the best examples for children, Colbert countered "Well, they may be rather more wealthy than most teenagers, but they have typical teenagers' problems and the important thing is they are fully realized personalities."

While in development, early names for the series' four lead characters were reported as "Troy", "Chrissie", "Raven" and "Pierce". Although the boys' names would remain into the production of the series, the girls' names were subsequently changed, with "Chrissie" eventually becoming series protagonist "Larke", and "Raven" eventually being renamed "Bianca."

Premise

The series takes place in Beverly Hills, California, and follows a fictional "Teen Club", consisting of a group of wealthy teenagers, shown to be approximately sixteen years old. Common settings include the teens' palatial high school, the country club, the local salon and spa, and the shopping thoroughfare on Rodeo Drive. The lead protagonist is Larke, a blonde-haired, blue-eyed high school student and fashion model who is shown to be kind and generous to her friends. Her romantic lead is handsome heartthrob Troy, who, like Larke, is shown to be genial and likable, and is often the object of affection for the other girls.

Providing much of the series' conflict is raven-haired beauty, Bianca, who views Larke as her primary rival for everything from the lead in the high school play, to the title of Homecoming Queen, and, most importantly, Troy's affections. Sharing her disdain for the perfect coupling is Pierce, an effeminate and narcissistic boy who presents himself as a "ladies' man", but resents Troy's relationship with Larke. Storylines frequently involve Bianca or Pierce, or sometimes both working together, plotting and/or manipulating events in an attempt to sabotage Larke and Troy's romance, as well as various other relationships within the Teen Club.

The other girls of the Teen Club include rocker girl Jett, cowgirl Blaze, aspiring actress Nikki, southern belle Tara, Teen Club President Shanelle, and gossip columnist Switchboard. The other boys of the Teen Club include rocker boy Gig, surfer boy Radley, self-promoter Buck Huckster, and Bianca's chauffeur Wilshire. In addition to their peer group, the teens are often accompanied by two youngsters, boy genius Chester and Pierce's little sister Jillian, while the rivalry between Larke's cat "Tiara" and Bianca's poodle "Empress" frequently provides the series with its more traditional slapstick comedy elements.

Voice cast

Michael Beattie as Wilshire Brentwood / Buck Huckster 
Karen Bernstein as Tara Belle / Jett Lyman
Tracey Moore / Terri Hawkes (some episodes) as Bianca Dupree / Blaze Summers / Jillian Thorndyke
Hadley Kay as Gig's guitar / Radley Coleman 
Corrine Koslo as Nikki Darling
Mary Long as Larke Tanner / Empress 
Stephen McMulkin as Pierce Thorndyke III
Jonathan Potts as Troy Jeffries
Sean Roberge as Chester McTech
Mark Saunders as Thomas "Gig" Josephson / Pierce Thorndyke Jr. (Jillian & Pierce's dad) 
Joanna Schellenberg as Brenda "Switchboard" Andes 
Linda Sorenson as Fifi
Michelle St. John as Shanelle Spencer

Episodes

Reception
In the 21st century, Beverly Hills Teens garnered a resurgence of attention from entertainment websites and newspaper columnists reminiscing about their childhoods in the 1980s. BuzzFeed writer, Brian Galindo playfully touted the camp appeal of the cartoon as "embodying '80s decadence", describing the series as "the original Beverly Hills, 90210, but way, way more ridiculous."

Dilshan Boange, columnist for the Sri Lankan newspaper The Nation cited the series (and, in particular, its theme song) for exporting American "epicurean" ideals, writing "The Beverly Hills Teens sing out the status quo of monopoly over 'style' and how it's 'done right'. It is a message to lesser mortals to take note. The center tells you what is 'in' and what's not. [...] Have you given much thought to how many US TV shows market their lifestyles to us on a daily basis through TV shows that speak of the 'American dream'?"

In Bulgaria, the show was first broadcast in 2002 on bTV as a part of the FoxKids block along other '80s and '90s shows such as Masked Rider and Inspector Gadget. Thus, the age cohort that grew up watching the show there were teens born from the late '80s to children born in the '90s. This introduced the '80s TV show to a much younger audience, including both Millennials and Generation Z members.

Accolades

Home media
During the series' lifespan, select episodes were released in the NTSC VHS format by DIC Entertainment and Golden Book Video. In 1990, select episodes were released on single episode VHS tapes by Celebrity Home Entertainment's Just for Kids Mini Features line.

On April 26, 2007, Déclic Images released a Volume 1 DVD box set featuring the first 23 French dubbed episodes of the series - known as Bécé Bégé (BCBG...short for "Bon Chic, Bon Genre" or "Good Style, Good Class") in France - in the Region 2 format. On November 28, 2007, Volumes 2 and 3, containing 20 and 22 episodes respectively, were released. On May 17, 2010, all 3 Volumes were made available for purchase as a 3-box set of the entire series.

On February 19, 2013, Mill Creek Entertainment released a Volume 1 DVD set featuring the first 32 episodes of the series in the Region 1 format.  On October 1, 2013, Volume 2, featuring the remaining 33 episodes, was released.

Broadcast UK history
The Children's Channel (March 1, 1994 – February 28, 1998) (Programmes: Beverly Hills Teens After Jem On The Children's Channel in 5 September 1994)

Related media
A video game had been in development by Tomahawk, but was cancelled.

References

External links

Beverly Hills Teen Club at DHXMedia.com

1980s American daily animated television series
1987 American television series debuts
1987 American television series endings
1980s Canadian animated television series
1987 Canadian television series debuts
1987 Canadian television series endings
American children's animated comedy television series
Canadian children's animated comedy television series
English-language television shows
First-run syndicated television programs in the United States
Teen animated television series
Television series by DIC Entertainment
Television shows set in Beverly Hills, California
Television shows set in Los Angeles